Slovakia competed at the 2014 Summer Youth Olympics, in Nanjing, China from 16 August to 28 August 2014.

Medalists

Archery

Slovakia qualified a male archer from its performance at the 2013 World Archery Youth Championships.

Individual

Team

Athletics

Slovakia qualified three athletes.

Qualification Legend: Q=Final A (medal); qB=Final B (non-medal); qC=Final C (non-medal); qD=Final D (non-medal); qE=Final E (non-medal)

Boys
Field Events

Girls
Track & road events

Field events

Boxing

Slovakia qualified one boxer based on its performance at the 2014 AIBA Youth World Championships

Boys

Canoeing

Slovakia qualified three boats based on its performance at the 2013 World Junior Canoe Sprint and Slalom Championships.

Boys

Girls

Cycling

Slovakia qualified a girls' team based on its ranking issued by the UCI.

Team

Mixed Relay

Football

Slovakia will compete in the girls' tournament.

Girls' Tournament

Roster

 Tamara Solárová
 Simona Čerkalová
 Nikola Vagaská
 Kristína Hrádeľová
 Lenka Kopčová
 Martina Šurnovská
 Alexandra Štrúbelová
 Timea Bochinová
 Mária Mikolajová
 Veronika Jančová
 Laura Suchá
 Denisa Mochnacká
 Tamara Gmitterová
 Katarína Májovská
 Denisa Mráziková
 Bianka Brúniková
 Andrea Herbríková
 Barbara Rigó

Group stage

Semi-final

Bronze medal match

Gymnastics

Artistic Gymnastics

Slovakia qualified one athlete based on its performance at the 2014 European MAG Championships.

Boys

Sailing

Slovakia was given a reallocation boat based on being a top ranked nation not yet qualified.

Shooting

Slovakia was given a wild card to compete.

Individual

Team

Swimming

Slovakia qualified three swimmers.

Boys

Girls

Tennis

Slovakia qualified three athletes based on the 9 June 2014 ITF World Junior Rankings.

Singles

Doubles

External links
 iaaf.org

References

2014 in Slovak sport
Nations at the 2014 Summer Youth Olympics
Slovakia at the Youth Olympics